Alexander Balashov (born 28 May 1967) is a former international speedway rider from Russia.

Speedway career 
Balashov is a three times world champion winning the gold medal at the Individual Ice Speedway World Championship in the 1994 Individual Ice Speedway World Championship, 1996 Individual Ice Speedway World Championship and 1998 Individual Ice Speedway World Championship.

In addition he won the Team Ice Racing World Championship seven times (1992, 1993, 1994, 1996, 1997, 1998 and 1999).

References 

1967 births
Living people
Russian speedway riders